Urangatha Sundary is a 1969 Indian Malayalam-language romantic psychological thriller film directed and produced by P. Subramaniam. It is a remake of Alfred Hitchcock's film Rebecca (1940). The film stars Sathyan, Rajasree, K. V. Shanthi and Jayabharathi in the lead roles. The film had musical score by G. Devarajan.

Plot
Prabhavathi meets rich Vikraman Karthavu and they both fall in love and get married. Vikraman brings Prabhavathi to his home - A huge imposing mansion in the middle of Moors. Prabhavathi learns from servants about Vikraman's first wife Vilasini who died in mysterious circumstances about a year ago. The housekeeper who was also the nanny of Vilasini is visibly disturbed by this and is cold towards Prabhavathi. Vikraman leaves on a business trip for a few weeks and Prabavathi is left to herself. This is when she encounters supernatural phenomena in the mansion and is haunted by the memories and spirit of Vilasini. Recovering from shock, Prabavathi decides to do her own investigation of Vilasini's mysterious death. One by one she uncovers shocking dark secrets about Vilasini, Vikraman and various other people.

Cast

Sathyan as Vikraman Kartha
Rajasree as Vilasini
K. V. Shanthi as Prabhavathi
Jayabharathi as Madhumathi
Adoor Pankajam as Madhavi
Bahadoor as Panicker
K. P. Ummer as Sudhakaran
Karamana Janardanan Nair as Advocate John
Nellikode Bhaskaran as Purushothaman
Pankajavalli as Ammavi
S. P. Pillai as Madman

Soundtrack
The music was composed by G. Devarajan and the lyrics were written by Vayalar Ramavarma.

References

External links
 

1969 films
1960s Malayalam-language films
Indian remakes of American films
Films directed by P. Subramaniam